In phonetics, aspiration is the strong burst of breath that accompanies either the release or, in the case of preaspiration, the closure of some obstruents. In English, aspirated consonants are allophones in complementary distribution with their unaspirated counterparts, but in some other languages, notably most South Asian languages (including Indian ones) and East Asian languages, the difference is contrastive.

In dialects with aspiration, to feel or see the difference between aspirated and unaspirated sounds, one can put a hand or a lit candle in front of one's mouth, and say spin  and then pin . One should either feel a puff of air or see a flicker of the candle flame with pin that one does not get with spin.

Transcription
In the International Phonetic Alphabet (IPA), aspirated consonants are written using the symbols for voiceless consonants followed by the aspiration modifier letter , a superscript form of the symbol for the voiceless glottal fricative . For instance,  represents the voiceless bilabial stop, and  represents the aspirated bilabial stop.

Voiced consonants are seldom actually aspirated. In the grammatical tradition of Sanskrit, aspirated consonants are called voiceless aspirated, and breathy-voiced consonants are called voiced aspirated.

There are no dedicated IPA symbols for degrees of aspiration and typically only two degrees are marked: unaspirated  and aspirated . The aspiration modifier letter may be doubled to indicate especially strong or long aspiration.

Preaspirated consonants are marked by placing the aspiration modifier letter before the consonant symbol:  represents the preaspirated bilabial stop.

Unaspirated or tenuis consonants are occasionally marked with the modifier letter for unaspiration , a superscript equals sign: . Usually, however, unaspirated consonants are left unmarked: .

Phonetics

Voiceless consonants are produced with the vocal folds open (spread) and not vibrating, and voiced consonants are produced when the vocal folds are fractionally closed and vibrating (modal voice). Voiceless aspiration occurs when the vocal folds remain open after a consonant is released. An easy way to measure this is by noting the consonant's voice onset time, as the voicing of a following vowel cannot begin until the vocal folds close.

In some languages, such as Navajo, aspiration of stops tends to be phonetically realised as voiceless velar airflow; aspiration of affricates is realised as an extended length of the frication.

Aspirated consonants are not always followed by vowels or other voiced sounds. For example, in Eastern Armenian, aspiration is contrastive even word-finally, and aspirated consonants occur in consonant clusters. In Wahgi, consonants are aspirated only when they are in final position.

Degree
The degree of aspiration varies: the voice onset time of aspirated stops is longer or shorter depending on the language or the place of articulation.

Armenian and Cantonese have aspiration that lasts about as long as English aspirated stops, in addition to unaspirated stops. Korean has lightly-aspirated stops that fall between the Armenian and Cantonese unaspirated and aspirated stops as well as strongly-aspirated stops whose aspiration lasts longer than that of Armenian or Cantonese. (See voice onset time.)

Aspiration varies with place of articulation. The Spanish voiceless stops  have voice onset times (VOTs) of about 5, 10, and 30 milliseconds, and English aspirated  have VOTs of about 60, 70, and 80 ms.

Doubling

When aspirated consonants are doubled or geminated, the stop is held longer and then has an aspirated release. An aspirated affricate consists of a stop, fricative, and aspirated release. A doubled aspirated affricate has a longer hold in the stop portion and then has a release consisting of the fricative and aspiration.

Preaspiration
Icelandic and Faroese have consonants with preaspiration , and some scholars interpret them as consonant clusters as well. In Icelandic, preaspirated stops contrast with double stops and single stops:

Preaspiration is also a feature of Scottish Gaelic:

Preaspirated stops also occur in most Sami languages.

Fricatives and sonorants
Similarly, aspirated fricatives and even aspirated nasals, approximants, and trills occur in a few Tibeto-Burman languages, in some Oto-Manguean languages, in the Hmongic language Hmu, and in the Siouan language Ofo.

Voiced consonants with voiceless aspiration
True aspirated voiced consonants, as opposed to murmured (breathy-voice) consonants such as the  that are common among the languages of India, are extremely rare. They have been documented in Kelabit.

Phonology
Aspiration has varying significance in different languages. It is either allophonic or phonemic, and may be analyzed as an underlying consonant cluster.

Allophonic

In some languages, stops are distinguished primarily by voicing, and voiceless stops are sometimes aspirated, while voiced stops are usually unaspirated.

English voiceless stops are aspirated for most native speakers when they are word-initial or begin a stressed syllable. Pronouncing them as unaspirated in these positions, as is done by many Indian English speakers, may make them get confused with the corresponding voiced stop by other English-speakers. Conversely, this confusion does not happen with the native speakers of languages which have aspirated and unaspirated but not voiced stops, such as Mandarin Chinese.

S+consonant clusters may vary between aspirated and nonaspirated depending upon if the cluster crosses a morpheme boundary or not. For instance, distend has unaspirated  since it is not analyzed as two morphemes, but distaste has an aspirated middle  because it is analyzed as dis- + taste and the word taste has an aspirated initial t.

Word-final voiceless stops are sometimes aspirated.

Voiceless stops in Pashto are slightly aspirated prevocalically in a stressed syllable.

Phonemic
In many languages, such as Armenian, Korean, Lakota, Thai, Indo-Aryan languages, Dravidian languages, Icelandic, Faroese, Ancient Greek, and the varieties of Chinese, tenuis and aspirated consonants are phonemic. Unaspirated consonants like  and aspirated consonants like  are separate phonemes, and words are distinguished by whether they have one or the other.

Consonant cluster
Alemannic German dialects have unaspirated  as well as aspirated ; the latter series are usually viewed as consonant clusters.

Tenseness

Absence
French, Standard Dutch, Afrikaans, Turkish, Tamil, Finnish, Portuguese, Italian, Spanish, Russian, Polish, Latvian and Modern Greek are languages that do not have phonetic aspirated consonants.

Examples

Chinese

Standard Chinese (Mandarin) has stops and affricates distinguished by aspiration: for instance, . In pinyin, tenuis stops are written with letters that represent voiced consonants in English, and aspirated stops with letters that represent voiceless consonants. Thus d represents , and t represents .

Wu Chinese and Southern Min has a three-way distinction in stops and affricates: . In addition to aspirated and unaspirated consonants, there is a series of muddy consonants, like . These are pronounced with slack or breathy voice: that is, they are weakly voiced. Muddy consonants as initial cause a syllable to be pronounced with low pitch or light (陽 yáng) tone.

Indian languages

Many Indo-Aryan languages have aspirated stops. Punjabi has lost voiced aspirated consonants, which resulted in a tone system, and therefore has a distinction between voiceless, aspirated, and voiced: .

Some of the Dravidian languages, such as Telugu, Malayalam, and Kannada, have a distinction between voiced and voiceless, aspirated and unaspirated.

Armenian

Most dialects of Armenian have aspirated stops, and some have breathy-voiced stops.

Western Armenian has a two-way distinction between aspirated and voiced: . Western Armenian aspirated  corresponds to Eastern Armenian aspirated  and voiced , and Western voiced  corresponds to Eastern voiceless .

Greek

Ancient Greek, including the Classical Attic and Koine Greek dialects, had a three-way distinction in stops like Eastern Armenian: .

There were aspirated stops at three places of articulation: labial, coronal, and velar . Earlier Greek, represented by Mycenaean Greek, likely had a labialized velar aspirated stop , which later became labial, coronal, or velar depending on dialect and phonetic environment.

Later, during the Koine and Medieval Greek periods, the aspirated and voiced stops  of Attic Greek lenited to voiceless and voiced fricatives, yielding  in Medieval and Modern Greek. Cypriot Greek is notable for aspirating its inherited (and developed across word-boundaries) voiceless geminate stops, yielding the series /pʰː tʰː cʰː kʰː/.

Other uses

Debuccalization
The term aspiration sometimes refers to the sound change of debuccalization, in which a consonant is lenited (weakened) to become a glottal stop or fricative .

Breathy-voiced release

So-called voiced aspirated consonants are nearly always pronounced instead with breathy voice, a type of phonation or vibration of the vocal folds. The modifier letter  after a voiced consonant actually represents a breathy-voiced or murmured dental stop, as with the "voiced aspirated" bilabial stop  in the Indo-Aryan languages.

Some linguists restrict the double-dot subscript  to murmured sonorants, such as vowels and nasals, which are murmured throughout their duration, and use the superscript hook-aitch  for the breathy-voiced release of obstruents.

See also

Aspirated h
Breathy voice
Implosive consonant
List of phonetic topics
Phonation
Preaspiration
Rough breathing
Smooth breathing
Tenuis consonant (Unaspirated consonant)
Voice onset time

Notes

References
Cho, T., & Ladefoged, P., "Variations and universals in VOT". In Fieldwork Studies of Targeted Languages V: UCLA Working Papers in Phonetics vol. 95. 1997.

Phonetics
Consonants by airstream